Snøgg may refer to
 SK Snøgg, a sports club from Notodden, Norway
 Snøgg class missile torpedo boat
 HNoMS Snøgg